Katha is a 2009 Telugu-language thriller film directed by Srinivas Raga. The film stars Genelia D'Souza in the lead and is produced by Urmila Gunnam.

Plot
Chitra (Genelia) is a loner who comes to Araku seeking employment as a school teacher. Krishna (Arun) is an aspiring director who comes to Araku for a test shoot and to complete the script of his debut film. Circle Inspector (Prakash Raj) has a wife and young kids. Chitra spent a year in a mental asylum because she witnessed her family being murdered. Chitra and Krishna become friends. While Chitra is looking through her binoculars, she witnesses a murder where she can clearly see the victim's face. Chitra reports the incident to the police, but they find no evidence of the crime. Chitra suspects that her past mental condition is relapsing. Eventually, the police finds out that the female victim did, in fact, exist. They have a CD that shows Circle Inspector and the female victim together in a store. The victim is none other than the Circle Inspector's dead girlfriend's daughter. He cannot acknowledge their illegitimate relation without tainting his reputation. It is revealed that he lured his daughter to Araku to kill her. Although Chitra witnessed the murder, the Circle Inspector tried to make it look like a figment of Chitra's imagination, and is infuriated when Chitra refuses to believe that the murder was her hallucination. Chitra and Krishna try to take the disc and escape, but Circle Inspector tries to kill Krishna, whose foot is injured by Krishna. Circle Inspector's holds Krishna at gunpoint, but Chitra refuses to give the disc to him. She slaps the Circle Inspector, who decides to let go of Krishna and commits suicide. Chitra says that she didn't think that Circle Inspector was going to kill her and Krishna because he already framed a dead officer for the victim's murder. Chitra and Krishna take the disc as evidence to the police. The film ends with the union of Chitra and Krishna.

Cast
 Genelia D'Souza as Chitra Singh 
 Adith Arun as Krishna 
 Prakash Raj as Circle Inspector 
 Aamir Tameem  as Raghu 
 Raghu Babu as Kanakala rao
 Shafi as Constable Raju
 Tulasi as Krishna's mother 
Shiva as Shiva
Ravi Kiran as Kiran
Kiran or kiran

Awards
Genelia D'Souza : Nandi Special Jury Award for Best Performance

References

External links

2009 films
2000s Telugu-language films